Timothy Kellner is a retired U.S. Army sniper with 139 confirmed kills and potentially another hundred unconfirmed; some estimates are as high as 300.  Kellner is featured in the book Kill Shot: The 15 Deadliest Snipers of All Time, written by Charles Stronge, where Kellner's background as a hunter is credited with enhancing his natural skills.

References

Living people
American military snipers
United States Army soldiers
Year of birth missing (living people)